Danielle Louise Macdonald (born 19 May 1991) is an Australian actress, known for her lead roles as Patricia "Patti" Dombrowski in the drama film Patti Cake$ (2017), and Willowdean Dickson in Dumplin' (2018). She is also known for her roles in the post-apocalyptic thriller film Bird Box as Olympia, the film Skin (2018) as Julie, the Netflix series Unbelievable as Amber, and the BBC One/Stan/HBO Max thriller series The Tourist as Helen.

Early life
Macdonald, who is of Italian and Scottish heritage,  was born in Sydney in 1991. She attended the Australian Institute for Performing Arts in Naremburn, New South Wales.

Having taken performing arts classes in grade 8, she moved on to improv and screen classes when she was in grade 10. When she was 17, Macdonald took some acting classes in Los Angeles and was encouraged to move to the United States to pursue things further. After deciding that acting would be her life, Danielle moved to Hollywood at age 18.

Career
At the age of 18, Macdonald moved to Los Angeles to pursue an acting career. She was originally booked for the role of Becca Huffstatter in the ABC drama series Huge, but her visa did not come in on time and she was unable to fill the role. Her first feature film was The East, which premiered at the 2013 Sundance Film Festival.

Macdonald is known for her starring role as Alice Manning in the 2014 crime film Every Secret Thing, alongside Dakota Fanning, Diane Lane, and Elizabeth Banks. Regarding Every Secret Thing, Katherine Pushkar from the New York Daily News wrote, "The film actually belongs to Danielle Macdonald, effective as cruel, jealous Alice." Macdonald also had a supporting role in the film Trust Me.

In 2016, she appeared in the season finale of American Horror Story: Roanoke as Bristol Windows. The following year, Macdonald starred in the drama film Patti Cake$ as the titular aspiring rapper in New Jersey. After working agentless for the first six years of her career, Macdonald signed with her first Hollywood agent after the success of Patti Cake$.

In December 2017, Macdonald appeared in the Netflix comedy series Easy, playing the role of a teenager who retaliates against her wealthy parents when they force her to go to church every week.

In 2018, Macdonald appeared in two Netflix films, opposite Jennifer Aniston in the adaptation of young adult novel Dumplin', by Julie Murphy; and Bird Box as Olympia, a pregnant woman who tries to survive the arrival of supernatural beings that make people want to kill themselves once they see it. She also portrayed Christa in the Academy Award-winning short drama film Skin.

In 2019, Macdonald appeared as Lillian Roxon in I Am Woman, the biopic of singer Helen Reddy, which showcased her Australian accent. About the role she said "I love that these are two Australian women that decided to go to the States by themselves in a time where that didn't happen, and have a commanding presence and say 'this is what I want to do, this is a career that I want to have.' I obviously moved from Australia when I was 18 to come and pursue a crazy career, so I could understand and relate.".

In 2021, Macdonald starred with Michelle Pfeiffer in French Exit. In the same year, Macdonald starred in the Ben Lewin-directed movie, Falling for Figaro. Macdonald plays Millie, a woman who quits her job to fulfill her dream of becoming an opera singer. She moves to Scotland where she is tutored by fearsome teacher, Meghan Geoffrey-Bishop (Joanna Lumley).

Macdonald starred in the series The Tourist alongside Jamie Dornan and Alex Dimitriades, in 2022. Macdonald plays the character of Helen Chambers, a police officer from a country town who is sent to investigate a man who suffered amnesia after a car crash.

Personal life
Danielle has Italian heritage on her mother's side.

Macdonald was personally affected by the catastrophic summer bushfires in Australia over 2019-20 when her cousin's house burnt down. While staying with family in Bateman's Bay NSW over Christmas, Macdonald and her family fled to safety in a car journey that would normally have taken three hours but took 13 hours through the fire-ravaged region.

, Macdonald lives with roommates and a menagerie of rescue pets in Los Angeles. Animal welfare is important to Macdonald and she lived as a pescatarian for five years, choosing to convert to veganism at the beginning of 2020.

Filmography

Film

Television

References

External links

 
 

1991 births
Living people
21st-century Australian actresses
Actresses from Sydney
Australian expatriate actresses in the United States
Australian film actresses
Australian television actresses
Australian people of Italian descent
Australian people of Scottish descent